Stefan Kikov (Bulgarian: Стефан Киков) (born 2 April 1982 in Plovdiv) is a Bulgarian footballer currently playing for Rakovski. Kikov usually plays as central defender or central midfielder.

References

External links

1982 births
Living people
Bulgarian footballers
Botev Plovdiv players
PFC Cherno More Varna players
OFC Sliven 2000 players
PFC Slavia Sofia players
FC Lyubimets players
PFC Svetkavitsa players
Doxa Drama F.C. players
First Professional Football League (Bulgaria) players
Expatriate footballers in Greece
People from Rakovski

Association football defenders